Pierrette Michel (born 17 March 1962) is a Belgian former backstroke and medley swimmer. She competed in two events at the 1976 Summer Olympics.

References

External links
 

1962 births
Living people
Belgian female backstroke swimmers
Belgian female medley swimmers
Olympic swimmers of Belgium
Swimmers at the 1976 Summer Olympics
Sportspeople from Liège